Prince Vladimir (Knyaz' Vladimir) is a 2006 Russian traditionally-animated feature film. It is loosely based on the story of prince Vladimir the Great, who converted Kievan Rus' to Christianity in the late 10th century. The film tells a romanticized version of the story, adapted for children and filled with fantasy elements.

Plot
The plot follows the events surrounding Vladimir from childhood and into adulthood.

In the beginning of the film, there were three pagan princes who ruled ancient Rus': Vladimir of Novgorod, Oleg of Drelinia, and Yaropolk, under the guidance of the wise volkhvy priests. The land was peaceful until a power-hungry student of one of the volkhvy killed his master, who cursed him and gave him the name "Krivzha" (meaning "crooked"). As a high priest and in his quest for dominance, he conspires with the Pecheneg khan Kurya to pillage Slavic villages to undermine the authority of the Slavic princes. Krivzha also influences Prince Vladimir to become a cruel ruler. Vladimir attempts to kill his brother Yaropolk, accusing him of killing Oleg.

Regretting the murder of his brother Yaropolk by his uncle Dobrynya, Vladimir does not suspect a conspiracy between the priest and the Pechenegs. Vladimir is concerned about gathering the Slavic tribes into one united state. Solving this major task, he faces obstacles, which Vladimir overcomes in the end, defeating Krivzha and winning the battle against Kurya.

Characters
Prince Vladimir - Grandson of the legendary princess Olga and son of great warlord Svyatoslav.
Krivzha - A priest and wizard who pontificates on behalf of Perun, Prince Vladimir's prime martial god, but in fact just skillfully shelters himself behind this to gain absolute power. He was cursed for killing his master, and he dislikes anything that is foreign. There were rumors that mention that he did bad things while in the guise of a bear, but those who saw him in this guise had gone missing.
Alexei (Aleksha) - An inquisitive and clever boy. Having lost his parents, he has been fostered by his grandfather. After his grandfather was killed, he was taken as a slave to a Pecheneg messenger, before he was purchased and brought to the Emperor at Constantinople by the rich noble Anastasius, who baptizes him as a Christian. He later returned to Rus', and escapes being captured by Krivzha's men.
Kurya - The chief of the Pechenegs. Used to be at enmity with Prince Svyatoslav, Vladimir's father. Since then, he has been a cruel and imperious leader of half-wild steppe tribe, planning and doing everything to invade Russian lands and harry Kiev.
Boyan - A kind and honorable old man. Contrary to Krivzha, he is a friendly pagan priest, the "wood grandsire"; he is a part of the nature, he talks with living trees and worships them. His staff is a home for bees, which tell him about all the news of the wood. Boyan is a personification of ancient Slavic wisdom, open-mindedness and patience.
Dobrynya - A waywode, Prince Vladimir's uncle and tutor. Harsh and straightforward. A warrior of tremendous power, sophisticated, whole-hearted in his devotion to the young Prince. The leader of the Slavic troops.
Olaf the Red-haired - A brave and cruel waywode. Used to be a waywode of Norwegian sea-king Harald the Blue Teeth's troops. Disagreed about carving-up the spoils of war, left the sea-king and now swears to serve young Prince Vladimir.
Hoten and Kostyanin - Brothers, Boyan's sons. Both are giants. Always together, and always searching for places where they can boast of their bravery.
Olga - Waywode Dobrynya's daughter. Grew up without a mother, a playful and lively girl.
Giyar - A son of the Pecheneg chief Kurya. A petty proudling, he was Alexei's everlasting rival.
Anastasius - An adviser of the Byzantine Emperor. He purchased Alexei from his former master and converted him to Christianity.
Byzantine Emperor - A wise politician, who sees in Russia not a rival or enemy but a possible ally, a defendant of orthodox Christians from eastern barbarians.
Anna - A Byzantine Empress and beauty. A sister of Byzantine emperors Basil II and Constantine VIII. Clever and proud-hearted.
Yaropolk - Vladimir's elder brother and by the will of Heaven – an obstacle on his way to the power.

Background

Production started in 1997 with research into the customs of the time period as well as character design. Originally, the story was to be told through a series of 30-minute shorts, but the idea was scrapped. The first proposal presentation of Prince Vladimir took place on April 17, 2000, at the Russian Cultural Fund. Soon after, work began in earnest, and about 120 animators were employed on the film. At the 2002 Annecy International Animated Film Festival, Prince Vladimir was named one of the world's 12 most anticipated upcoming animated films. The first official presentation of the finished film took place on February 3, 2006, for the press.

A sequel, Prince Vladimir - The Feat (Князь Владимир. Подвиг) was scheduled for release in 2008, but cancelled.

Reception
Many in the public thought that the film was part of the light-hearted "3 bogatyrs" trilogy by Melnitsa Animation Studio (the second film in the trilogy, Dobrynya Nikitich and Zmey Gorynych, was due for release on March 16), and were surprised and dismayed at the film's serious tone. Critical reaction was mixed. Critics praised the film's art and animation but criticized it for its inaccurate portrayal of the historical period and for perceived ideological pandering to its main sponsor, the Russian Orthodox Church.

It is the highest-grossing Russian animated film of all time, taking in $5.8 million since its release, and is the third highest-grossing animated film within Russia (behind Madagascar and Flushed Away). It cost $5 million to make, however (far more than Melnitsa's films, which are made for about $300,000 or a million), the film is thought to have either lost money or narrowly broken even.

Voice cast

See also
History of Russian animation
List of animated feature films
List of historical drama films

External links

Film Trailers
Andrei Ryabovitchev's blog - info and artwork from the film (2005-early 2006 entries)

References

2006 films
Animated films based on Slavic mythology
Biographical action films
Christian animation
Cultural depictions of Vladimir the Great
Films about Christianity
Films about Orthodoxy
Films based on Russian folklore
Films set in Russia
Films set in the 10th century
Films set in the 11th century
Films set in the Byzantine Empire
Films set in Ukraine
Historical action films
Kievan Rus in fiction
Russian animated films
2000s Russian-language films
Russian children's fantasy films
Russian biographical films
Russian historical films